The Lord of the Rings: The Rings of Power is an American fantasy television series developed by J. D. Payne and Patrick McKay for the streaming service Amazon Prime Video. Based on the novel The Lord of the Rings and its appendices by J. R. R. Tolkien, the series is set thousands of years before Tolkien's The Hobbit and The Lord of the Rings and depicts the major events of Middle-earth's Second Age. It is produced by Amazon Studios in association with New Line Cinema and in consultation with the Tolkien Estate. The series features a large ensemble cast comprising characters from Tolkien's writings as well original creations for the series.

The following list is divided based on the different cultures of Middle-earth, and then ordered per first appearance within the series.

Elves 

 Galadriel (portrayed by Morfydd Clark):An Elven warrior who believes evil is returning to Middle-earth. The series shows the character's journey from a warrior to the "elder stateswoman" that she is portrayed as in Tolkien's The Lord of the Rings. The showrunners based her initial depiction in the series on a letter in which Tolkien described a young Galadriel as being of "Amazon disposition". Clark said her fluency in Welsh made it easier to learn Galadriel's Elvish lines. Amelie Child-Villiers portrays a young Galadriel.
 Finrod (portrayed by Will Fletcher):Galadriel's brother who died hunting Sauron.
 Thondir (portrayed by Fabian McCallum ):An Elf hunting for Sauron with Galadriel.
 Rían (portrayed by Kip Chapman):An Elf hunting for Sauron with Galadriel.
 Elrond (portrayed by Robert Aramayo):A half-Elven architect and politician. Aramayo was interested in exploring the pressure that Elrond faces living up to the legacy of his father, Eärendil, as well as the fact that Elrond chose to be immortal unlike his brother Elros, whom Elrond had to watch grow old and die. Elrond goes from being optimistic and eager to world-weary and closed-off throughout the series.
 Gil-galad (portrayed by Benjamin Walker):The High King of the Elves who rules from the realm of Lindon. The character is mentioned in Tolkien's The Lord of the Rings in a poem called "The Fall of Gil-galad", and Walker said the series would expand on that. He highlighted the character's "odd gift of foresight. He's prescient, and he's ahead of the curve. He can kind of feel the pulse of evil rising."
 Arondir (portrayed by Ismael Cruz Córdova):A Silvan Elf with a forbidden love for the human healer Bronwyn, similar to Tolkien's love stories about Beren and Lúthien and Aragorn and Arwen.
 Médhor (portrayed by Augustus Prew):An Elf serving with Arondir.
 Revion (portrayed by Simon Merrells):The Elven Watchwarden of the Southlands.
 Celebrimbor (portrayed by Charles Edwards):The Elven smith who forges the Rings of Power, he is a "brilliant artisan" known throughout Middle-earth who is friends with the Dwarves of Khazad-dûm.

Dwarves 
 Durin IV (portrayed by Owain Arthur):The prince of the Dwarven city of Khazad-dûm. It took three hours to apply Arthur's Dwarven prosthetics each day.
 Disa (portrayed by Sophia Nomvete):Durin IV's wife and princess of the Dwarven city of Khazad-dûm. Disa and the other female Dwarves have facial hair, but they don't have large beards like the male Dwarves in the series.
 Durin III (portrayed by Peter Mullan):King of the Dwarven city of Khazad-dûm.

Low Men 
 Waldreg (portrayed by Geoff Morrell):A Man in Bronwyn's village.
 Tredwill (portrayed by Peter Tait):A Man in Bronwyn's village.
 Rowan (portrayed by Ian Blackburn):A Man in Bronwyn's village.
 Bronwyn (portrayed by Nazanin Boniadi):A human mother and healer who owns an apothecary in the Southlands.
 Theo (portrayed by Tyroe Muhafidin):Bronwyn's son.

High Men 
 Elendil (portrayed by Lloyd Owen):A Númenórean sailor and Isildur's father who will eventually be a leader in the last alliance between Elves and Men.
 Míriel (portrayed by Cynthia Addai-Robinson):The queen regent of Númenor, an island kingdom ruled by Men descended from Elrond's half-Elven brother Elros.
 Pharazôn (portrayed by Trystan Gravelle):A Númenórean advisor to queen regent Míriel.
 Isildur (portrayed by Maxim Baldry):A Númenórean sailor who will eventually become a warrior and king. The writers wanted to explore Isildur's story more than the source material so the audience would feel that it ends in tragedy rather than foolishness. Co-showrunner Patrick McKay compared the character to Al Pacino's Michael Corleone from The Godfather (1972).
 Ontamo (portrayed by Anthony Crum):A Númenórean sailing cadet.
 Valandil (portrayed by Alex Tarrant):A Númenórean sailing cadet.
 Eärien (portrayed by Ema Horvath):Isildur's sister, who was created for the series. Horvath and Baldry bonded in New Zealand by bungee jumping and zip-lining together.
 Kemen (portrayed by Leon Wadham):Pharazôn's son.

Harfoots 
 Sadoc Burrows (portrayed by Lenny Henry):A Harfoot elder. Henry described the Harfoots as "the traditional Tolkien little guy... the little people in this world provide comedy but also get to be incredibly brave".
 Marigold Brandyfoot (portrayed by Sara Zwangobani):A Harfoot and Nori's mother.
 Malva (portrayed by Thusitha Jayasundera):A Harfoot.
 Vilma (portrayed by Maxine Cunliffe):A Harfoot.
 Largo Brandyfoot (portrayed by Dylan Smith):A Harfoot and Nori's father.
 Elanor "Nori" Brandyfoot (portrayed by Markella Kavenagh):A Harfoot with a "yearning for adventure".
 Dilly Brandyfoot (portrayed by Beau Cassidy):A Harfoot and Nori's brother.
 Poppy Proudfellow (portrayed by Megan Richards):A curious Harfoot.

Other characters 
 Sauron (portrayed by Charlie Vickers):The former lieutenant of the Dark Lord Morgoth who disguises himself as the human Halbrand to deceive Galadriel and the rest of Middle-earth.
 The Stranger (portrayed by Daniel Weyman):One of the Istari, who falls from the sky in a flaming meteor and befriends Nori.
 Adar (portrayed by Joseph Mawle in season 1 and Sam Hazeldine in season 2):A fallen Elf and the leader of the Orcs.

References

External links 

The Lord of the Rings: The Rings of Power